Andrew McKee was a submarine engineer.

Andrew or Andy McKee may also refer to:

Andrew McKee (RAF officer) (1902–1988), British air marshall
Andy McKee, fingerstyle guitar player
Andy McKee (bassist) (born 1953), American bass player